Edward Phillips (1 March 1851 – 8 February 1933) was an Australian cricketer. He played in six first-class matches for South Australia between 1877 and 1890.

See also
 List of South Australian representative cricketers

References

External links
 

1851 births
1933 deaths
Australian cricketers
South Australia cricketers
Cricketers from Adelaide